In the run-up to the 2021 German federal election, various organisations will carry out opinion polling to gauge Chancellor preferences in Germany. Results of such polls are displayed in this list.

The date range for these opinion polls are from the previous federal election, held on 24 September 2017, to the present day. The next election will be held on 26 September 2021, unless a State of Defence is called before then.

Some opinion pollsters, mainly Forsa, ask voters which party leader or popular politician they would prefer as Chancellor since Angela Merkel announced to step down as Chancellor of Germany at the forthcoming election.

Chancellor candidates 
These polls gauge voters' opinions on the three main parties' Chancellor candidates: Armin Laschet for CDU/CSU (Union), Olaf Scholz for the Social Democratic Party,  and Annalena Baerbock for Alliance 90/The Greens.

Laschet vs. Scholz vs. Baerbock 
Graph of opinion polls conducted

Laschet vs. Scholz

Laschet vs. Baerbock

Scholz vs. Baerbock

Speculative polling 
These polls were conducted before the announcement of each party's Chancellor candidate, and gauged opinion on various politicians who were considered to be plausible candidates for their respective parties.

All candidates 
Graph of opinion polls conducted

Söder vs. Scholz vs. Baerbock

Laschet vs. Scholz vs. Habeck

Merkel vs. Scholz vs. Baerbock

Söder vs. Scholz vs. Habeck

Söder vs. Merz vs. Scholz vs. Habeck vs. Laschet vs. Röttgen vs. Baerbock

Merz vs. Scholz vs. Habeck

Spahn vs. Scholz vs. Habeck

Söder vs. Scholz

Söder vs. Habeck

Merz vs. Scholz

Merz vs. Habeck

Laschet vs. Habeck

Kramp-Karrenbauer vs. Scholz

Kramp-Karrenbauer vs. Habeck

Scholz vs. Habeck

Kramp-Karrenbauer vs. Esken

Kramp-Karrenbauer vs. Walter-Borjans

Walter-Borjans vs. Habeck

Kramp-Karrenbauer vs. Scholz vs. Habeck

Kramp-Karrenbauer vs. Nahles

Kramp-Karrenbauer vs. Schulz

Kramp-Karrenbauer vs. Gabriel

Merz vs. Nahles

Merkel vs. Nahles

Merkel vs. Scholz

Spahn vs. Nahles

Spahn vs. Scholz

Merkel vs. Schulz

See also 
Opinion polling for the 2017 German federal election
Opinion polling for the 2013 German federal election

External links 
Wahlrecht.de 
pollytix-Wahltrend 
DAWUM Wahltrend 
Twitter: @Wahlen_DE 

Next